The Church of St. Hubertus is a historic Catholic church in Chanhassen, Minnesota, United States, built in 1887.  It was listed on the National Register of Historic Places in 1982 for having local significance in the themes of "community planning and development" and "exploration/settlement". It was nominated for symbolizing the Franciscan brotherhood that platted and grew the German Catholic settlement that became Chanhassen.

The town itself was first named St. Hubertus before it became Chanhassen.  The congregation was established by Father Aloysius Wewer in 1877.  The 1887 building was actually the third building used by the congregation.  It was built by John Geiser (1812–1902), who also carved the altar and built about 30 other churches in his lifetime.  The parish built its fourth church building in 1976, then built its present building in 1997.

See also
 List of Catholic churches in the United States
 National Register of Historic Places listings in Carver County, Minnesota

References

External links

1887 establishments in Minnesota
Churches in Carver County, Minnesota
Churches in the Roman Catholic Archdiocese of Saint Paul and Minneapolis
Roman Catholic churches completed in 1887
Churches on the National Register of Historic Places in Minnesota
German-American culture in Minnesota
National Register of Historic Places in Carver County, Minnesota
19th-century Roman Catholic church buildings in the United States